Pioneer is the third full-length studio album by The Maine. The album sold over 12,000 copies in its first week, debuting at number 90 on the Billboard 200.

Background
In May and June 2011, the group went on a co-headlining US tour with Augustana. During the tour, the group debuted several new songs. On June 5, the group revealed that they had started recording their next album before the tour began, and were going to continue following the tour's conclusion. Recording took place at Sonic Ranch in El Paso, Texas with producer Colby Wedgeworth. On June 22, the group performed a new track titled "Don't Give Up on "Us"" on Fuel TV.

Release
In October and November, the group supported Taking Back Sunday on their headlining US tour. On October 5, Alternative Press reported that the group's next album would be titled Pioneer and was due for released in either late November or early December. On October 27, the group announced that the album would be released in December. In addition, a trailer was released which featured a snippet of a new track titled "Some Days". In November and December, the group went on a headlining US tour. On November 1, "Don't Give Up on "Us"" was made available for streaming. Later that day, the album's track listing and artwork were revealed. On November 6, a lyric video was released for "Don't Give Up on "Us"". On November 9, the group released a video of them making the album. On November 15, "Some Days" was made available for streaming. A lyric video was released for the track on November 21.

On December 2, Pioneer was made available for streaming, before being released on December 6 through the band's own label, Action Theory. "Misery" was made available for streaming on December 2, 2011. The album features singles "Don't Give Up On Us" and "Some Days." To promote its release, the group held a livestream event via Stickam called This Is Pioneer. It featured a documentary on the making of the album and a concert where the band performed material from all of their previous albums and EPs. Shortly afterwards, the group performed at the Unsilent Night festival. In January and February 2012, the band supported All Time Low on their UK tour. On January 22, the group released "Take Me Dancing", an outtake from the album, as a free download. On February 5, a lyric video was released for the track. On February 16, a music video was released for the song. Later in February, the group embarked on a European tour.

Between April and June, the group went on a headlining US tour with support from Lydia and Arkells. On July 27, a music video was released for "Like We Did (Windows Down)". A behind-the-scenes video was subsequently released. On September 11, Pioneer was reissued in the UK through Rude Records. Under the new title Pioneer & the Good Love, it featured new artwork and six new songs. The new songs were also released separately on the Good Love EP, which was released on the same day. A behind-the-scenes video of the group recording the new songs was also released. On September 30, the group performed at the Bazooka Rocks Festival in the Philippines. On October 11, the band released an alternative version of "Like We Did (Windows Down)" under the name "Like We Did (When We Were Lost)". They explained it was "a more abstract take on friendship and adventure". In October and November, the group went on a co-headlining US tour with Mayday Parade. They were supported by The Postelles. On October 20, the group released a music video for "Thinking of You".

Track listing
All lyrics written by John O'Callaghan, all music composed by The Maine.

Chart performance

Personnel
 Members
 John O'Callaghan – lead vocals, piano
 Jared Monaco – lead guitar
 Kennedy Brock – rhythm guitar, vocals
 Garrett Nickelsen – bass guitar
 Pat Kirch – drums, percussion

 Production
Tim Kirch – Art direction, design, management
Adrian Lozano – Engineering
Dirk Mai – Art direction, design, photography
The Maine – Composer, engineer, producer
Kyle Miller – Design
John O'Callaghan – Art direction, design
Matt Salveson – Engineering
Matthew Van Gasbeck – Engineering, keyboard
Colby Wedgeworth – Engineering, mastering, mixing, producer

References

External links

Pioneer at YouTube (streamed copy where licensed)

The Maine (band) albums
2011 albums
Albums recorded at Sonic Ranch